Prosomphax is a very small genus in the geometer moth family (Geometridae). As of 2005, only four species had been described; all are found in the southern half of Africa. This little-studied genus belongs to the emerald moth subfamily (Geometrinae), but beyond that its relationships are still rather obscure.

The species of Prosomphax are:
 Prosomphax callista Warren, 1911
 Prosomphax deuterurga Prout, 1922
 Prosomphax anomala (Warren, 1902)
 Prosomphax horitropha Krüger, 2005

Footnotes

References
  (2005): New species of geometrid moths from Lesotho (Lepidoptera: Geometroidea: Geometridae). Annals of the Transvaal Museum 42: 19-45. HTML abstract
  (2004c): Butterflies and Moths of the World, Generic Names and their Type-species – Prosomphax. Version of 2004-NOV-05. Retrieved 2011-APR-21.

Geometrinae
Geometridae genera